Alan Stevens (born 20 January 1933) is a Hong Kong sailor. He competed in the Finn event at the 1964 Summer Olympics.

References

External links
 
 

1933 births
Living people
Hong Kong male sailors (sport)
Olympic sailors of Hong Kong
Sailors at the 1964 Summer Olympics – Finn
Place of birth missing (living people)